Michal Riszdorfer (born 26 May 1977 in Bratislava) is a Slovak sprint canoer who has competed since the late 1990s. Competing in three Summer Olympics, he won two medals in the K-4 1000 m with a silver in 2008 and a bronze in 2004.

Riszdorfer has also won fourteen medals at the ICF Canoe Sprint World Championships with eight golds (K-2 500 m: 1998, K-2 1000 m: 1999, K-4 500 m: 2002, 2003, 2006, 2007; K-4 1000 m: 2002, 2003), three silvers (K-4 200 m: 2009, K-4 500 m: 2005, K-4 1000 m: 2005), and three bronzes (K-4 500 m: 2001, K-4 1000 m: 2007, 2009).

Riszdorfer is a member of the ŠKP club in Bratislava. He is 177 cm (5 ft 10 in) tall and weighs 78 kg (172 lb).

Personal life
Riszdorfer comes from the Hungarian minority in Slovakia. He was born in Bratislava and lived in Komárno, home to a sizeable Hungarian community on the shores of the Danube, since his early childhood. He has a younger brother Richard, who is also a canoer and member of the multiple medal winning K-4 boat.

References

External links
 
 
 
 

1977 births
Canoeists at the 2000 Summer Olympics
Canoeists at the 2004 Summer Olympics
Canoeists at the 2008 Summer Olympics
Living people
Olympic canoeists of Slovakia
Olympic silver medalists for Slovakia
Olympic bronze medalists for Slovakia
Slovak male canoeists
Olympic medalists in canoeing
Hungarians in Slovakia
ICF Canoe Sprint World Championships medalists in kayak
Medalists at the 2008 Summer Olympics
Medalists at the 2004 Summer Olympics
Sportspeople from Bratislava